Douglas Wilmer (8 January 1920 – 31 March 2016) was an English actor, best known for playing Sherlock Holmes in the 1965 TV series Sherlock Holmes.

Early life
Wilmer was born in Brentford, Middlesex, and received his education at King's School, Canterbury, and Stonyhurst College. A performance as the Archbishop of Canterbury in a school play at King's School was seen by Dame Sybil Thorndike who afterward told the headmaster "If that boy, playing the Archbishop, were to take to the stage, I think that he could well make a go of it." After completing school, Wilmer applied for a scholarship at Royal Academy of Dramatic Art and was accepted. Whilst in training at RADA, he was conscripted into the British Army for military service with the Royal Artillery in the Second World War. After training, he was posted to an anti-tank battery, and saw war service in Africa with the Royal West African Frontier Force. He was later invalided out of the Armed Forces, having contracted tuberculosis.

Career
Wilmer made his theatre stage debut in 1945 in repertory at Rugby. He appeared frequently on the London stage, mainly in classical and Shakespearean roles. He made his first major film appearance in Laurence Olivier's  Richard III (1955); thereafter, he appeared in a large number of films, mostly in supporting roles. They include several epic films: as M. Desmoulins in The Battle of the River Plate (1956), as Al-Mu'tamin in El Cid (1961), Cleopatra (1963), The Fall of the Roman Empire (1964), as Khalifa Abdullah in Khartoum (1966), as Maj. Gen. Francis de Guingand in Patton (1970), as Sir Thomas Fairfax in Cromwell (1970), and Antony and Cleopatra (1972).  Other appearances include Jason and the Argonauts (1963) as Pelias, the Pink Panther films A Shot in the Dark (1964) and Revenge of the Pink Panther (1978),  The Vampire Lovers (1970), The Golden Voyage of Sinbad (1974), and Octopussy (1983).

He is mainly associated with the role of Sherlock Holmes, which he first played in the BBC's 1964 production of "The Speckled Band". Together with co-star Nigel Stock, who played Doctor Watson, Wilmer was brought back for a further twelve episodes of the Sherlock Holmes series. In 1973, Wilmer played author Jacques Futrelle's Holmesian detective Professor Van Dusen in The Rivals of Sherlock Holmes for ITV. In 1975, he once again appeared as Holmes (albeit in a supporting role) in Gene Wilder's The Adventure of Sherlock Holmes' Smarter Brother, with Thorley Walters as Dr. Watson. Wilmer also played Sir Denis Nayland Smith in two of Harry Alan Towers' Fu Manchu films, The Brides of Fu Manchu (1966) and The Vengeance of Fu Manchu (1967).

He recorded a series of the stories on audiocassette for Penguin audio books and appeared as a guest at several UK and US events, including the Society's Golden Jubilee Dinner in January 2001. His other television credits include: The Adventures of Robin Hood, The Saint, The Troubleshooters, The Avengers, The Baron, UFO, and Space: 1999. He made a cameo appearance in "The Reichenbach Fall" episode of Sherlock as an irate old man in the Diogenes Club.

Honours and awards
Wilmer was an honorary member of the Sherlock Holmes Society of London, which considered Wilmer "the definitive Holmes". On 24 March 2009 Wilmer was guest of honour at a launch party for his book, held at the National Liberal Club in Whitehall Place, London.

Personal life and death
Douglas Wilmer was married three times. In 1946, he married Elizabeth Melville, a fellow RADA student, their marriage was annulled after 25 years. His second marriage in 1973 to wife Barbara ended in a divorce. He married his third wife, Anne (née Harding) in 1985. He lived in Woodbridge, Suffolk in later life, where he ran a wine bar called Sherlock's.

Wilmer's autobiography Stage Whispers (Porter Press) was published in 2010. On 31 March 2016, after a short bout of pneumonia, Wilmer died aged 96 at Ipswich Hospital in Suffolk, England. Roger Moore posted a tribute on social media the same day that Wilmer had died; the actors had worked together in the James Bond feature film Octopussy (1983) and on the television show The Saint (a 1963 episode).

Filmography

 It is Midnight, Doctor Schweitzer (1953, TV Movie) as Father Charles
 Sacrifice to the Wind (1954, TV Movie) as Menelaus
 The Men of Sherwood Forest (1954) as Sir Nigel Saltire
 Richard III (1955) as The Lord Dorset
 Passport to Treason (1955) as Dr. Randolf
 The Battle of the River Plate (1956) as M. Desmoulins - French Minister, Montevideo
 Dial 999 (TV series), ('Ghost Squad', episode) (1959) as Burton
 An Honourable Murder (1960) as R. Cassius
 El Cid (1961) as Moutamin
 Marco Polo (1962)
 Cleopatra (1963) as Decimus
 Jason and the Argonauts (1963) as Pelias
 The Fall of the Roman Empire (1964) as Pescennius Niger
 Woman of Straw (1964) as Dr. Murray (scenes deleted)
 A Shot in the Dark (1964) as Henri LaFarge
 The Golden Head (1964) as Detective Inspector Stevenson
 One Way Pendulum (1964) as Judge / Maintenance Man
 Khartoum (1966) as Khalifa Abdullah
 The Brides of Fu Manchu (1966) as Nayland Smith
 The Vengeance of Fu Manchu (1967) as Nayland Smith
 Hammerhead (1968) as Pietro Vendriani
 A Nice Girl Like Me (1969) as Postnatal Clinic Doctor
 The Reckoning (1969) as Moyle
 Patton (1970) as Major General Freddie de Guingand
 Cromwell (1970) as Sir Thomas Fairfax
 The Vampire Lovers (1970) as Baron Joachim Von Hartog
 Journey to Murder (1971) as Harry Vaneste (Do Me a Favor and Kill Me)
 Unman, Wittering and Zigo (1971) as Headmaster
 Antony and Cleopatra (1972) as Agrippa
 The Golden Voyage of Sinbad (1973) as Vizier
 The Adventure of Sherlock Holmes' Smarter Brother (1975) as Sherlock Holmes
 The Incredible Sarah (1976) as Montigny
 Revenge of the Pink Panther (1978) as Police Commissioner
 Rough Cut (1980) as Maxwell Levy
 Octopussy (1983) as Jim Fanning
 Sword of the Valiant (1984) as The Black Knight

See also
List of people who have played Sherlock Holmes

References

External links

1920 births
2016 deaths
English male film actors
English male television actors
English male stage actors
English male Shakespearean actors
People educated at The King's School, Canterbury
People educated at Stonyhurst College
Royal Artillery soldiers
British colonial army soldiers
British Army personnel of World War II
Alumni of RADA
People from Brentford
20th-century English male actors
Deaths from pneumonia in England